

Prva futsal liga Srbije/First Futsal League of Serbia

Clubs
The first futsal league of Serbia currently has 12 clubs:

Other Clubs
 KMF Bajina Bašta
 KMF Krčagovo - Užice
 KMF Požega
 KMF Užice
 KMF Kolorado - Gornji Milanovac
 KMF Mali Zvornik
 KMF Zlatiborac - Čajetina
 KMF Župski Rubin
 KMF Raška
 KMF Partenon - Smederevska Palanka
 KMF Mašinac - Kragujevac
 KMF Ekonomac 2 - Kragujevac
 KMF Ivanjica
 KMF Aranđelovac
 KMF RB 014 - Valjevo
 KMF Kragujevac
 KMF Niš 92
 KMF Pirot
 KMF Timok
 KMF AS - Bujanovac
 KMF Prokuplje
 KMF Bor
 KMF Akademac - Niš
 KMF Dolap - Prokuplje
 KMF Deus Futsal - Mitrovica
 KMF Leteći Holanđanin - Vrbas, Serbia
 KMF Forum - Vršac
 KMF Tvrđava - Novi Sad
 KMF Hajduk - Kula, Serbia
 KMF Tango Liman - Novi Sad
 KMF Viking - Ruma
 KMF Srbobran
 KMF Kikinda
 KMF Šampion - Subotica
 KMF Slodes
 KMF Foto Klik Fleš
 KMF Ekonomist - Belgrade
 KMF TMF
 KMF Intelektualac - Belgrade
 KMF Kolubara
 KMF Radnički
 KMF Radec
 KMF Kareli - Ub, Serbia
 KMF Kosjerić
 KMF Dela Tores - Šabac
 KMF Fleš - Valjevo
 KMF Požarevac
 KMF Olimp - Vrnjačka Banja
 KMF 92 - Užice
 KMF Orao Čaršija - Arilje
 KMF Karanovac - Kraljevo
 KMF Timok 2013-2 - Zaječar
 KMF Banjica - Bela Palanka
 KMF Jastrebac - Niš
 KMF BSK - Bujanovac
 KMF Ekonmist - Niš
 KMF Burbusovac - Knjaževac
 KMF Zufo - Bujanovac
 KMF Rota - Bujanovac
 KMF Babušnica 2011
 KMF Telep - Novi Sad
 KMF Apa Futsal - Apatin
 KMF Kraljevićevo - Kačarevo
 KMF TPK - Temerin
 KMF Kruna - Novi Sad
 KMF Sombor 
 KMF BSK - Bački Brestovac
 KMF Seničani Aranđelovac
 KMF Bačka - Bačka Palanka
 KMF Kepa 9 - Stajićevo
 KMF Bezbednost 192 Valjevo 

Futsal in Serbia